Hong Ji-hoon (Hangul: 홍지훈), born 27 October 1988) is a South Korean badminton player.

Career 
In 2006, he won a gold medal at the BWF World Junior Championships in the boys' singles event. He defeated Tommy Sugiarto of Indonesia with the score 21–13, 10–21, and 21–16. He became a semi-finalist of the Vietnam Open tournament in the men's doubles event. He and partner Choi Ho-jin were defeated by their teammates Yoo Yeon-seong and Jeon Jun-bum with the score 21–16, 21–19. He also became the runner-up of the Mongolian Satellite tournament in men's singles.

In 2007, he won his first senior title at the Indonesia International Challenge tournament in men's singles. He reached the final round after beating Indra Bagus Ade Chandra of Indonesia 21–16, 21–11. In the final round, he defeated his compatriot Lee Cheol-ho 21–15, 11–21, 21–11. In 2010, he won a silver medal with Korea national badminton team at the Asian Games in the men's team event held in Guangzhou, China. In the final round, they were defeated by China national badminton team in 3–1.

In 2011, he became the champion of the Turkey International tournament in the men's singles. Hong had to work hard to beat Malaysia's Tan Chun Seang in three hard games 22–24, 21–12, 21–16. In 2012, he competed at the Thomas Cup tournament with the Korea national team held in Wuhan, China. They were defeated by the China national team 3–0.

In 2013, he was runner-up at the Korea Grand Prix Gold in the men's singles after being defeated by his teammate Lee Hyun-il 21–18, 21–12. He represented Kyonggi University competed at the 2013 Summer Universiade, and won a gold medal in the men's team and a bronze medal in the men's doubles events.

Achievements

Summer Universiade 
Men's doubles

World Junior Championships 
Boys' singles

Asian Junior Championships 
Boys' singles

Mixed doubles

BWF Grand Prix 
The BWF Grand Prix had two levels, the BWF Grand Prix and Grand Prix Gold. It was a series of badminton tournaments sanctioned by the Badminton World Federation (BWF) which was held from 2007 to 2017.

Men's singles

  BWF Grand Prix Gold tournament
  BWF Grand Prix tournament

BWF International Challenge/Series 
Men's singles

  BWF International Challenge tournament
  BWF International Series tournament

References

External links 
 

1988 births
Living people
South Korean male badminton players
Badminton players at the 2010 Asian Games
Asian Games silver medalists for South Korea
Asian Games medalists in badminton
Medalists at the 2010 Asian Games
Universiade gold medalists for South Korea
Universiade bronze medalists for South Korea
Universiade medalists in badminton
Medalists at the 2013 Summer Universiade
21st-century South Korean people